Ocean Grove may refer to:
 Ocean Grove (band), a nu metal band from Melbourne, Victoria, Australia
 Ocean Grove, Victoria, a coastal town in Australia
 Ocean Grove, New Zealand, a suburb of Dunedin, New Zealand
 Ocean Grove, Massachusetts, a census-designated place in Swansea, Massachusetts, United States 
 Ocean Grove, New Jersey, an unincorporated community in Neptune Township, New Jersey, United States

See also
 Ocean Grove Nature Reserve